The Dock Labour Party was a socialist political organisation which existed in the Dock ward in Belfast in the 1950s. Along with the "Diamond Labour Party" and "O'Sullivan Labour Party", the Dock Labour Party was a faction separate to the Northern Ireland Labour Party, which was unionist.

Gerry Fitt was involved and stood as a candidate at one stage.

References

Politics of Belfast
Defunct political parties in Northern Ireland
Labour parties in Northern Ireland